Skeleton Canyon, called Cañon Bonita by the Mexicans, is located  northeast of the town of Douglas, Arizona, in the Peloncillo Mountains, which straddle the modern Arizona and New Mexico state line, in the New Mexico Bootheel region.

This canyon connects the Animas Valley of New Mexico with the San Simon Valley of Arizona, and was once a main route between the United States and Mexico for both legal and illegal traffic.  While originally known as Guadalupe Canyon, the area became called Skeleton Canyon, as a result of the bones of cows and humans left behind from cattle drives from Mexico.

Battles 

The canyon was the site of several battles during the American Old West. In 1879, a group of outlaw Cowboys attacked a group of Mexican Rurales and stole their cattle. In July 1881, Curly Bill Brocius attacked and killed about a dozen Mexican smugglers carrying silver and heading to the United States.  In retribution, the Mexican government attacked and killed Newman Haynes Clanton and others as they were driving cattle through Guadalupe Canyon. In 1883, Apache Indians from Chihuahua's band surprised eight troopers of Troop D, Fourth Cavalry, killed three men, burned the wagons and supplies, and drove off forty horses and mules.

Geronimo's surrender 

Geronimo's final surrender to General Nelson A Miles on September 4, 1886, occurred at the western edge of this canyon. As the surrender site is now on private property, commemorative monument has been erected to the northwest along SR 80, where it intersects with Skeleton Canyon Road in Arizona, at geographic coordinates .

Murders and shootouts

On November 4, 1889, Judson "Comanche" White was found dead in Skeleton Canyon after being killed by person or persons unknown; all his possession had been stolen as well.

On August 12, 1896, a shoot-out between the Christian gang and a posse resulted in the Skeleton Canyon shootout.

See also
 Geronimo's War and the role of two Apache scouts
 Indian Wars West of the Mississippi
 Skeleton Canyon Shootout
 Skeleton Canyon Massacre
 Skeleton Canyon treasure
 Guadalupe Canyon Massacre

References

External links
 Evolution, Use, and Effectiveness of the Apache Indian Scouts
 Jul 31, 1937, Apache scout Martine dies
 Photos of Canyon and monument
 Scouts Guide Lieutenant Gatewood to Geronimo's and Naiche's camp

Arizona folklore
Canyons and gorges of Arizona
Canyons and gorges of New Mexico
Cochise County conflict
Geronimo
Landforms of Cochise County, Arizona
Landforms of Hidalgo County, New Mexico
New Mexico Bootheel
New Mexico folklore